Leptocyrtinus nitidus is a species of beetle in the family Cerambycidae. It was described by Per Olof Christopher Aurivillius in 1926 and is known from Samoa.

References

Cyrtinini
Beetles described in 1926